The Zelter River or Zheltura is a river in northern Mongolia and Russia.

It starts in Selenge sum of Bulgan aimag at the confluence of smaller rivers, and runs in a north-eastern direction, largely parallel to the Russian border.
At the sum center of Tüshig sum in Selenge aimag it turns north and crosses the border into the Dzhidinsky District of the Republic of Buryatia in Russia. There it discharges into the Dzhida River after a short distance, next to the village Zheltura.

References 

Rivers of Mongolia